Egypt competed at the 1952 Summer Olympics in Helsinki, Finland. 106 competitors, all men, took part in 65 events in 14 sports.

Medalists

Bronze
 Abdel Aaal Rashed — Wrestling, Greco-Roman Featherweight.

Athletics

Basketball

Men's Team Competition
Qualification Round (Group C)
 Defeated Turkey (64-52)
 Lost to Canada (57-63)
 Defeated Italy (66-62)
Main Round (Group D)
 Lost to France (64-92)
 Lost to Chile (46-74)
 Defeated Cuba (66-55) → did not advance, 10th place

Boxing

Diving

Men's 3m Springboard
Ahmed Kamel Aly
 Preliminary Round — 62.95 points (→ 17th place)
Kamal Ali Hassan
 Preliminary Round — 62.68 points (→ 18th place)
Ahmed Fahti Mohamed Hashad
 Preliminary Round — 50.04 points (→ 33rd place)

Equestrian

Fencing

Eight fencers, all men, represented Egypt in 1952.

Men's foil
 Mahmoud Younes
 Salah Dessouki
 Mohamed Ali Riad

Men's team foil
 Salah Dessouki, Mohamed Ali Riad, Osman Abdel Hafeez, Mahmoud Younes, Mohamed Zulficar, Hassan Hosni Tawfik

Men's épée
 Mohamed Abdel Rahman

Men's team épée
 Osman Abdel Hafeez, Salah Dessouki, Mahmoud Younes, Mohamed Abdel Rahman

Men's sabre
 Mohamed Abdel Rahman
 Ahmed Abou-Shadi

Men's team sabre
 Mohamed Zulficar, Mohamed Abdel Rahman, Salah Dessouki, Mahmoud Younes, Ahmed Abou-Shadi

Football

Gymnastics
Men's Single Event

Rowing

Egypt had eight male rowers participate in three out of seven rowing events in 1952.

 Men's single sculls
 Hussein El-Alfy

 Men's coxed pair
 Mohamed Anwar
 Ali Tawfik Youssif
 Albert Selim El-Mankabadi (cox)

 Men's coxed four
 Ibrahim El-Attar
 Mohamed El-Sahrawi
 Mamdooh El-Attar
 Mohamed El-Sayed
 Albert Selim El-Mankabadi (cox)

Shooting

Six shooters represented Egypt in 1952.

50 m pistol
 Antoine Shousha
 Mohamed Ahmed Aly

300 m rifle, three positions
 Ahmed Hamdy
 Saad El-Din El-Shorbagui

50 m rifle, three positions
 Ahmed Hamdi
 Antoine Shousha

50 m rifle, prone
 Antoine Shousha
 Ahmed Hamdi

Trap
 Seifollah Ghaleb
 Youssef Fares

Swimming

Water polo

Weightlifting

Wrestling

References

External links
Official Olympic Reports
International Olympic Committee results database

Nations at the 1952 Summer Olympics
1952
Olympics